The  is an electrical multiple unit (EMU) train type operated by the private railway operator Tokyu Corporation on express services on the Tokyu Oimachi Line in Japan since 28 March 2008. Based on the 5000 series design, cars have four sets of doors per side with a more aerodynamic front end design than its predecessors.

Formation

, the fleet consists of six seven-car sets, numbered 6101 to 6106 and formed as follows, with four motored (M) cars and three trailer (T) cars, and car 1 at the Oimachi end. 

Cars 2 and 3 are fitted with one pantograph, and car 5 is fitted with two pantographs.

Interior

Wheelchair spaces are provided at the ends of cars 2, 3, and 5.

History

The first set, 6101, was delivered in December 2007. The first trains entered revenue-earning service on 28 March 2008.

Six new DeHa 6300 intermediate cars were delivered from the J-TREC factory in Yokohama in August 2017. These will be used to lengthen the fleet of six trainsets to seven cars each between November 2017 and March 2018.

Two "Q-Seat" DeHa 6300 intermediate cars were delivered in 2019; the two vehicles are numbered DeHa 6301 and DeHa 6302. The newly built cars replaced the original DeHa 6300 cars that were used to lengthen sets 6101 and 6102. The outgoing cars were stored at J-TREC's Yokohama facility until 2021, when they were repurposed to aid in lengthening the Meguro Line 5080 series sets to eight cars.

References

External links

 Tokyu EMU details 
 Tokyu 6000 series (Japan Railfan Magazine) 

Electric multiple units of Japan
6000 series
Train-related introductions in 2008
Tokyu Car multiple units
1500 V DC multiple units of Japan